Polystemma is a genus of flowering plants of the family Apocynaceae first described as a genus in 1844. It is native to Mexico and Central America.

Species
 Polystemma guatemalense (Schltr.) W.D.Stevens - from Nayarit to Costa Rica
 Polystemma mirandae Lozada-Pérez - Guerrero, Oaxaca, Puebla
 Polystemma viridiflora Decne. - Michoacán, Veracruz, Oaxaca, Chiapas

References

Apocynaceae genera
Asclepiadoideae
Taxa named by Joseph Decaisne